Michael Waterson may refer to:

 Mike Waterson (1941–2011), English writer, songwriter and folk singer.
 Michael Waterson (economist), British economist, researcher and academic